danceWEB Europe is a non profit association of dance organisations based in Vienna, Austria led by "danceWEB/Vienna". Funded under the "Culture 2000 programme of the European Union" in 2002 to 31 May 2005 with a community grant of €900,000 and in 2005 up to 31 May 2008 with a community grant of €900,000. to develop contemporary dance throughout Europe and to link the international dance scene and education, enhancing dialogue between cultures.

Activities
Scholarships: the scholarship program started in 1996 awarded to 50 dancers each year, the scholarships provide for participation in the ImPulsTanz Vienna International Dance Festival.
Multimedia: technology and the web are used as a tool to use the mass media. Short documentaries have been produced of contemporary dance performances to reach a broad audience.
Coproduction / Touring: emerging European choreographers and dancers are supported in  multinational projects and touring.

Members

Notes

External links 
 danceWEB - Europe
 Culture 2000 – exercise 2002 3 multi-annual co-operation projects … 3) danceWEB - Europe

Dance organizations
Organisations based in Vienna
Dance in Austria
Music in Vienna
European culture